Rude Spur is a rock spur  northwest of Mount Circe that descends from the east side of Mount Cassidy at the plateau of Victoria Land toward Balham Lake and Balham Valley. Named by Advisory Committee on Antarctic Names (US-ACAN) after United States Antarctic Research Program (USARP) oceanographer Jeffrey D. Rude who drowned in McMurdo Sound, October 12, 1975, when the tracked vehicle he was driving broke through bay ice and sank in the vicinity of Erebus Glacier Tongue and Turtle Rock.
 

Ridges of Victoria Land
Scott Coast